Jubilee College may refer to:

 Jubilee College (Illinois), a former private college in Peoria County, Illinois, United States
 Jubilee Christian College, in Atherton, Queensland, Australia
 Jubilee Mission Medical College and Research Institute, in Kerala, India
 Jubilee College, at the Jockey Club Campus of the Open University of Hong Kong
 Jubilee College of Music, at Olivet University in Anza, California